Mangelia hontensis is an extinct species of sea snail, a marine gastropod mollusc in the family Mangeliidae.

Description
The length of the shell attains 6 mm.

Distribution
This extinct marine species was found in Miocene strata of Hungary.

References

External links
 Worldwide Mollusc Species Data Base : Mangelia hontensis

hontensis
Gastropods described in 1953